Mount Zion Baptist Church is a historic church on Opequon Lane in Martinsburg, West Virginia.

Built during 1836–38,  in plan, with stonework "unequalled" in Berkeley County.  As of 1980 the church was in use only about once yearly.

It was added to the National Register of Historic Places in 1980.

References

Baptist churches in West Virginia
Churches in Berkeley County, West Virginia
Buildings and structures in Martinsburg, West Virginia
National Register of Historic Places in Berkeley County, West Virginia
Churches on the National Register of Historic Places in West Virginia